Víctor Guzmán may refer to:

Víctor Guzmán (footballer, born 1995), Mexican footballer
Víctor Guzmán (footballer, born 2002), Mexican footballer